Triplophysa dorsalis, the Grey Stone Loach, is a species of stone loach in the genus Triplophysa that lives in freshwater. It is found in Uzbekistan, Kazakhstan, Kyrgyzstan and Xinjiang (westernmost China).

The species is usually found in water with slow currents, river coves and lakes. It prefers the quiet water to live in. Its maximum length is  TL and the common length is  SL. Lives at range of temperature of 18 °C-22 °C.

References 

D
Freshwater fish of China
Fish of Central Asia
Fauna of Kyrgyzstan
Taxa named by Karl Kessler
Fish described in 1872